Upside Down is Thomas Leeb's third available release and features 12 instrumentals.

Track listing

 "Albino"
 "The Hard Can 2005 remix"
 "Erzherzog Johann Jodler"
 "I Shot The Sheriff"
 "Upside Down"
 "Spark"
 "While My Guitar Gently Weeps"
 "The Boys of Blue Hill"
 "Sweet Child O' Mine"
 "Muss I Denn / Twinkle"
 "Jovka"
 "Sleepless"

All songs by Thomas Leeb, except 
 "Erzherzog Johann Jodler" (Traditional, arr. Leeb)
 "I Shot The Sheriff" (Bob Marley, arr. Leeb)
 "While My Guitar Gently Weeps" (George Harrison, arr. Leeb)
 "Sweet Child o'Mine" (Guns'N'Roses, arr. Leeb)
 "Muss I Denn / Twinkle" (Traditional, arr. Leeb)
 "Jovka" (Traditional, arr. Leeb)

Personnel

Thomas Leeb – acoustic guitar
Eric Spitzer – mixing & mastering

References

2006 albums
Thomas Leeb albums